Defeatism is the acceptance of defeat without struggle, often with negative connotations. It can be linked to pessimism in psychology, and may sometimes be used synonymously with fatalism or determinism.

History
The term defeatism is commonly used in politics as a descriptor for an ideological stance that considers co-operation with the opposition party. In the military context, in wartime, and especially at the front, defeatism is synonymous with treason.

Under military law, a soldier can be accused of being defeatist if he refuses to fight by voicing doubt of the ideological validity of national policy; thus, existential questions such as "Is the war already lost?" and "Is the fight worth the effort?" are defeatism that connote advocacy of an alternative end-to-the war other than military victory.

"Defeatism" in Nazi Germany

Defeatism became a buzzword in Germany following its capitulation in 1918, particularly among the Nazi Party led by Adolf Hitler, who routinely blamed this loss on a "defeatist mentality". After seizing power, his obsession with denouncing opponents for "defeatism" grew more acute as time went on, and was widely noted.

During World War II, Hitler unexpectedly dismissed many generals for defeatism. More prudent military commanders such as Field Marshal Albert Kesselring felt constrained to present the Führer a rosier account of the battlefront situation than was realistic, to avoid being labeled "defeatist".

During the last year of war, the German people's court executed many people accused of defeatist talks or acts and their names were announced weekly in a pink colored poster pasted on billboards around the country. In March, 1945, as Red Army tanks were closing in on Berlin, Nazi officials worked feverishly to suppress "cowardice and defeatism" in their own ranks with summary death sentences.

Revolutionary defeatism 
Revolutionary defeatism is a related idea, made most prominent by Vladimir Lenin, that establishes that the proletariat cannot win or gain in a capitalist war. Instead, according to Lenin, the true enemy of the proletariat is the imperialist leaders who send their lower classes into battle. Workers would gain more from their own nations’ defeats, he argued, if the war could be turned into civil war and then international revolution.

See also 
 Fatalism
 Psychology
 Learned Helplessness

Notes 

Concepts in the philosophy of mind
Mental states
Political philosophy
Emotions